The Billingham Stars are an ice hockey team from the town of Billingham in the borough of Stockton-on-Tees in County Durham. They are currently members of the National Ice Hockey League playing in its Moralee Conference. The Stars play their home games at the Billingham Forum.

The Stars are currently coached by ex-Durham Wasps players Robert Wilkinson and Stephen Foster.

Notable ex-Billingham players include current GB International and Sheffield Steelers Robert Dowd and Patrice Lefebvre who went on to play 3 games in the NHL for the Washington Capitals.

History
The Billingham Bombers were founded in 1971 as members of the Northern League. In 1982 they became a founder member of the British Hockey League and changed their name to the Cleveland Bombers. Between 1991 and 1995 the team played under the name of the Teesside Bombers before reverting to their original name. Between 1982 and 1986 and again between 1990 and 1994, the Bombers played in the Premier League, the top flight division of British ice hockey at the time.

In more recent times the Bombers won the English League Northern section regular season championship and Northern section play off championship during the 2005–06 season.

The Billingham Bombers did not compete in any league due to a refurbishment of their home venue TFM Radio Ice Arena in the 2009/10 and 2010/11 seasons

Ice Hockey returned to the forum in the 2011/12 seasons after merging with the Northern Stars who were facing problems with their home rink, the Metro Radio Arena. The new club was renamed Billingham Stars.

In 2011/12, the club's first season back following two seasons away from Ice Hockey, Billingham Stars were successful in their attempt to become champions of the English National League, Northern Division. The Championship was finally won with the penultimate league match, at home to Trafford Metros in a 2–2 draw, giving Billingham the final point required to ensure the title.

In 2012/13 Billingham Stars finished as runners up to Solway Sharks for both the League and Cup as well as runners up to the Blackburn Hawks in the end of season playoffs.

In 2013/14 season Billingham finished the season in 3rd position and were knocked out of the end of season Playoffs by 2nd placed Blackburn Hawks.

In the 2014/15 season Billingham finished 2nd to Blackburn Hawks, whilst also making the end of season playoff finals at Dumfries, Scotland.  Billingham Stars lost the playoff final game vs Blackburn Hawks.

In 2015/16 season Billingham failed to make the Playoffs finishing in 5th position. However, as a consolation they did win the Northern Cup Competition.

Club roster 2022-23 
(*) Denotes a Non-British Trained player (Import)

2021/22 Outgoing

Retired Numbers

Club Records

League titles

ED1: 2 (1998/99, 1999/00)
ENL: 3 (2000/01, 2005/06, 2011/12)

Play-Off Titles

ED1 Playoffs:  (1998/99)
ENL Playoffs: 3 (2000/01, 2011/12)

Cup Titles

NIHL Northern Cup:  (2015/16)

Individual Records

Most Games Played: Paul Windridge (569)
Most Goals Scored (All Time): Paul Windridge (367)
Most Assists (All Time): Paul Windridge (712)
Most Points Scored (All Time): Paul Windridge (1,079)
Most Penalty Minutes (All Time): Scott Ward (644)
Most Goals Scored in a Season: John Hutchings (120) (1987/88)
Most Assists in a Season: Pat Mangold (136) (1987/88)
Most Points Scored in a Season: Pat Mangold (252) (1987/88)
Most Penalty Minutes in a Season: Ricky Box (187) (2006/07)

References

A to Z Encyclopedia of Ice Hockey
Elite Prospects - Billingham Stars Roster & Stats
Nottingham Panthers Statistical History 1946–2000 by Mick A. Chambers

External links
Official Website of the Billingham Stars

Ice hockey teams in England
Billingham
Sport in the Borough of Stockton-on-Tees